Pennsylvania State Senate District 43 includes part of Allegheny County. It is currently represented by Democrat Jay Costa.

District profile
The district includes the following areas:

Allegheny County:

Senators

References

Government of Allegheny County, Pennsylvania
Government of Pittsburgh
Pennsylvania Senate districts